Dietmar Jürgen Daichendt (born 1967 in Sibiu, Romania) is a German professor of medicine in the field of Osteopathy, Chiropractic and Manual medicine. He is a practising medical doctor in Munich and lectures at the universities Deutsche Hochschule für Gesundheit und Sport and the Steinbeis-Hochschule Berlin. He also has a teaching assignment for the Ludwig Maximilian University of Munich or the Deutsche Gesellschaft für Chirotherapie und Osteopathie.

Daichendt was appointed to the first professorship for Manual medicine (chiropractic and osteopathic) in Germany in 2011 as well as to the first professorship for Osteopathic and Manual medicine in Germany in 2015.

He is president of the scientific medical institute German Society for Chirotherapy and Osteopathy (German: Deutsche Gesellschaft für Chirotherapie und Osteopathie).

He is known for articles and interviews in media.

References

External links
 German Society for Chirotherapy and Osteopathy

Living people
Academic staff of the Ludwig Maximilian University of Munich
1967 births
People from Sibiu
German chiropractors
Osteopathic physicians
Manual medicine